A voice interface card or VIC is a hardware interface that simulates a FXS on a router or network switch.  This device port is used to interface telephone voice or other audio-based FXS devices.

Typically, a VIC contains one or more RJ-11 ports, allowing connections to basic telephone service (POTS), equipment, keysets, and PBXes.

References

External links
Understanding Foreign Exchange Office (FXO) Voice Interface Cards

Telephony signals